Jamie Laura Chadwick (born 20 May 1998) is a British racing driver who races for Andretti Autosport in  Indy NXT. She won the inaugural W Series season in 2019, before retaining her title in 2021 and 2022. She currently holds the records for the most wins, podiums, pole positions and points in the W Series. She has also competed in the Race of Champions for Great Britain alongside David Coulthard, as well as racing in Extreme E. She is a development driver for the Williams Formula One team.

Personal life
Chadwick was born on 20 May 1998 in Bath and grew up on the Isle of Man. Her father Michael is a property developer, and her mother Jasmine is an Indian-born businesswoman. Chadwick was educated at Cheltenham College, Gloucestershire. She currently resides in London and is in a relationship with racing driver Struan Moore.

Career

2010–16: Early career
Chadwick started her motorsports career in kart racing at the age of 11, following her brother Oliver into the sport. She started car racing in 2013 when she turned down a trial with the England under-18 hockey team to compete at the Ginetta Junior scholarship weekend, where she triumphed to win a scholarship for the 2013 Ginetta Junior Championship season. Chadwick raced alongside her brother for the JHR Developments team, finishing tenth in the championship, second-last of all full-time competitors and behind her teammate and brother Oliver. She remained in the series for 2014, taking five podium finishes during the year to finish eighth overall in the championship.

In March 2015, Chadwick was announced as one of the drivers for Beechdean Motorsport in the 2015 British GT Championship, competing in the GT4 class. Chadwick and her co-driver, Ross Gunn, an Aston Martin factory driver, took two wins and five podiums during the season in their Aston Martin V8 Vantage, including a win in the Silverstone 24-Hour race. This made Chadwick the first female and youngest ever champion of the British GT Championship.

Going into 2016, Chadwick stayed in British GT Championship, driving in the GT4 pro class with Generation AMR SuperRacing for the first, second and sixth rounds, before returning to Beechdean Motorsport to race in the pro-am class with Paul Hollywood for the final three races of the season. Chadwick ultimately finished fifteenth in the championship.

Chadwick also competed in race 9 of the 2016 VLN season, driving the Nexcel AMR Aston Martin GT8 and finishing third in the SP8 class.

2017–19: Transition to single-seater racing
Chadwick moved into single-seater racing in 2017, joining Double R Racing to compete in the 2017 BRDC British Formula 3 Championship. She achieved her first and only podium of the season with a third place finish at Rockingham in the fifth round of the championship, ultimately finishing ninth overall for the season. For the 2018 season, Chadwick remained in the BRDC British Formula 3 Championship, moving to Douglas Motorsport. In August, she became the first ever woman to win a British F3 race by claiming victory in the reversed-grid race at Brands Hatch, and finished the season in eighth place.

Chadwick also entered the 2018 24 Hours of Nürburgring, driving the Aston Martin Vantage V8 GT4 in the SP8 class alongside Jonathan Adam, Alex Lynn and Pete Cate. The team finished fifth in class and sixty-third overall.

Chadwick proceeded to sign on for the 2018-19 MRF Challenge season in November 2018, and topped both initial practice sessions. Chadwick had success in the early rounds of the championship, finishing second in three of the five races in the opening weekend in Dubai. She followed this up with wins in six of the remaining ten races at Bahrain and Chennai to take the title, becoming the first ever woman to win the MRF Challenge. Chadwick also participated in two test drives with the NIO Formula E team in Riyadh and Marrakesh.

2019–present: W Series, Williams F1, Prema Powerteam and Andretti Autosport

In March 2019, Chadwick was announced as one of the entrants for the inaugural season of the W Series, and followed this by participating in the opening three races of the 2019 F3 Asian Championship. Chadwick was also announced as an official junior driver for Aston Martin Racing, extending an existing unofficial relationship that dated back to 2014. At the first W Series race at Hockenheim, Chadwick put in a dominant performance, leading both practice sessions and qualifying on pole. Despite briefly giving up the race lead to Alice Powell, Chadwick came from behind to take the first win in W Series history. Two weeks later at Zolder, Chadwick again started on pole, however lost the lead to Beitske Visser from the start, and had to fight off Powell after locking up and running wide later in the race, ultimately holding onto second place.

Two days after the race in Zolder, Chadwick became the second driver to join the Williams Driver Academy, signing on as a development driver for the team. In the next W Series race at Misano the following month, Chadwick qualified second behind Fabienne Wohlwend, but passed her on the start and held off pressure from Visser to take her second W Series win. Chadwick then finished in third place behind Marta García and Visser at Norisring, after a long battle with the latter that saw her lose second place on the start and make a late lunge in an attempt to regain the place towards the end of the race.

At Assen, Chadwick started and finished in third, holding off late pressure from Visser. In the non-championship reverse grid race the following day, Chadwick fought through the field to finish eighth after starting from the back of the grid. Chadwick then entered the 2019 24 Hours of Nürburgring with Aston Martin, racing alongside Alex Brundle and Peter Cate in the Aston Martin Vantage AMR GT4, finishing first in the SP8 class and twenty-seventh overall. Chadwick entered the W Series championship decider at Brands Hatch with a 13 point lead on second placed Visser, and proceeded to start on pole for the third time. Despite defending the lead initially, she lacked race pace and lost positions to Powell, Emma Kimiläinen and finally Visser, however her eventual fourth placed finish was enough to hold off Visser and win the inaugural W Series title.

In September 2019, Chadwick joined Double R Racing to test drive their Euroformula Open car in Silverstone, with a view to a competitive drive in the series in the future. The following week, Chadwick was announced as one of the competing drivers in the inaugural series of Extreme E in 2021.

In 2020, Chadwick was awarded her first 10 of the 40 points (of the 25 points for free practice) needed to qualify for a FIA Super Licence, after finishing fourth overall in the 2019–20 F3 Asian Championship. 

On 16 June 2020, following the cancellation of the 2020 W Series season due to the COVID-19 pandemic, it was announced that she had joined Italian outfit Prema Powerteam, to be one of the team's four drivers in the 2020 Formula Regional European Championship. Despite being the most experienced driver in the field, she only managed 9th in the standings, 263 points behind her nearest teammate and third-last of all drivers to complete the whole season.

In March 2021, Williams announced that Chadwick would continue as a development driver for the 2021 season. Later that year she would reclaim her W Series title after a close, season-long battle with Alice Powell—thus adding 15 points to her Super Licence points tally and making her available for future free practice sessions in Formula One.

On 22 February 2022, Chadwick was confirmed to stay in W Series for a 3rd season, driving for Jenner Racing. She qualified on pole position for the second race of the 2022 season, which was part of the double header at the Miami International Autodrome, as the drivers' second best qualifying times set the grid for the second race. She won the first race, overtaking Emma Kimiläinen on the final lap. She won the second race the next day, as well as the one at the Circuit de Barcelona-Catalunya, meaning she had won five consecutive W Series races, four of which were in America. Following the early termination of the 2022 W Series championship for financial reasons, Chadwick was declared series champion for the third time, ahead of second-placed Beitske Visser.

In August of 2022, Andretti Autosport announced that it planned to test Chadwick in one of the team's Dallara IL-15 Indy Lights cars at Sebring International Raceway in September 2022. The test took place on 21 September and Chadwick covered over 120 laps of the circuit. Subsequently, it was announced on 1 December 2022 that Andretti Autosport had signed Chadwick to drive in the 2023 Indy NXT season.

Chadwick remained with the Williams Driver Academy in 2023.

Racing record

Career summary

* Season still in progress.

Complete British GT Championship results
(key) (Races in bold indicate pole position in class) (Races in italics indicate fastest lap in class)

Complete W Series results
(key) (Races in bold indicate pole position) (Races in italics indicate fastest lap)

Complete Formula Regional European Championship results
(key) (Races in bold indicate pole position) (Races in italics indicate fastest lap)

† Driver did not finish the race, but was classified as they completed more than 90% of the race distance.

Complete Extreme E results
(key)

Silverstone 24 Hour results

American open-wheel racing results

Indy NXT
(key) (Races in bold indicate pole position) (Races in italics indicate fastest lap) (Races with L indicate a race lap led) (Races with * indicate most race laps led)

References

External links

 
 

1998 births
Living people
People educated at Cheltenham College
Sportspeople from Bath, Somerset
British racing drivers
British GT Championship drivers
English female racing drivers
W Series drivers
Britcar 24-hour drivers
British people of Indian descent
Formula Regional European Championship drivers
F3 Asian Championship drivers
Ginetta Junior Championship drivers
Double R Racing drivers
Prema Powerteam drivers
Extreme E drivers
W Series Champions
MRF Challenge Formula 2000 Championship drivers
BRDC British Formula 3 Championship drivers
JHR Developments drivers
Aston Martin Racing drivers
Nürburgring 24 Hours drivers
Indy Lights drivers
Andretti Autosport drivers